R. Sundarrajan may refer to:

 R. Sundarrajan (director) (born 1955), Indian Tamil-language film director and actor
 R. Sundarrajan (politician), Indian politician